Ismael Tajouri-Shradi (born 28 March 1994) is a professional footballer who plays as an attacking midfielder for Omonia. Born in Switzerland, he represents the Libya national team.

Early life
Tajouri-Shradi was born in Bern, Switzerland, to Libyan parents. His father was a diplomat. He moved to Austria at the age of 9, and received his Austrian passport in March 2016. He has always considered himself Libyan.

Club career
Shradi spent his early career at Austria Wien, coming up through the youth ranks in 2013 before going on loan to Rheindorf Altach. After two-and-a-half years at Altach, Shradi returned to Austria Wien and became a regular starter.

Shradi signed with Major League Soccer (MLS) club New York City FC on 12 January 2018. In his debut season, he scored 11 league goals while also contributing 3 assists.

On 14 December 2021, Tajouri-Shradi was selected by Charlotte FC in the 2021 MLS Expansion Draft and was immediately traded to Los Angeles FC in exchange for $400,000 in General Allocation Money. He was traded again on 5 August 2022, joining New England Revolution in exchange for $400,000 In General Allocation Money.

On 4 January 2023, Tajouri-Shradi joined Cypriot club Omonia.

International career
Shradi debuted for the Libyan under-20s in a friendly with the Morocco under-20s in the summer of 2012.

He debuted for the Libya senior national team in a 0–0 2019 Africa Cup of Nations qualification tie with South Africa on 8 September 2018.

Personal life
In February 2019, Tajouri-Shradi earned a U.S. green card which qualifies him as a domestic player for MLS roster purposes.

Career statistics

Club

International

Honours
New York City FC
MLS Cup: 2021

References

1994 births
Living people
Libyan footballers
Libya international footballers
Libya youth international footballers
Libyan expatriate sportspeople in the United States
Austrian footballers
Austrian people of Libyan descent
Austrian Football Bundesliga players
2. Liga (Austria) players
Austrian Regionalliga players
FK Austria Wien players
SC Rheindorf Altach players
New York City FC players
Los Angeles FC players
New England Revolution players
Major League Soccer players
Expatriate soccer players in the United States
Association football forwards
Footballers from Bern
Austrian expatriate sportspeople in the United States
Austrian expatriate footballers
Libyan expatriate footballers